is a Japanese voice actress. She started acting in 2000 and she's affiliated with Mausu Promotion, with her talent agency managed by: Katsuta Voice Actor's Academy.

Filmography

Anime television series
 Banner of the Stars
 Fighting Beauty Wulong - Debby Kroffat
 Gakuen Alice - Owl(Episode 4)
 Geisters - Chris Vesta, Tara-Chamarel
 Gallery Fake - Female Character
 Listen to Me, Girls. I Am Your Father! -  Day Care Worker (Episodes 8, 10-12)
 Naruto - Ayame
 Naruto: Shippuden - Ayame
 One Piece - Vivi
 Saiyuki Gunlock - Mother(Episodes 17)
 Saiyuki Reload - Sha Gojyo(child)(Episodes 5, 21); Young Hostess(Episodes 3)
 Scrapped Princess - Operator
 ToHeart Remember my Memories - Pupil(Episode 7)
 Tokyo Underground - Controller(Episode 20)

Anime OVAs
 Banner of the Stars III - Woman Prisoner, Crew B, Female
 Crest of the Stars Lost Chapter - Lina

Anime Films
 Naruto the Movie: Ninja Clash in the Land of Snow - Children
 WXIII: Patlabor the Movie 3

Drama CD

Games
 Sentimental Graffiti - Women's classmate, Evil Kid 2
 Full House Kiss - Emi Dōshi
 Full House Kiss 2 - Emi Dōshi, Schoolgirl
 killer7 - Ayame Blackburn
 Kingdom Hearts II - Additional Voices
 Naruto Ultimate Ninja - Ayame

Dubbing

Live-action films
 Burlesque – Georgia (Julianne Hough)
 The Dust Factory – Melanie Lewis (Hayden Panettiere)
 A Good Year – Christie Roberts (Abbie Cornish)
 Harry Potter and the Goblet of Fire
 The House Bunny – Joanne (Rumer Willis)
 Ice Princess – Additional Japanese Voice-Dubbing Role
 John Q. (2007 NTV edition) – Julie Byrd (Heather Wahlquist)
 Malèna
 The Suite Life Movie – Zack Martin (Dylan Sprouse)
 Torque – Additional Japanese Voice-Dubbing Role

Television
 24 – Nicole Palmer (Megalyn Echikunwoke)
 Barney & Friends – Riff (replacing Michaela Dietz's voice)
 Lizzie McGuire – Melina Bianco (Carly Schroeder)
 Just for Kicks – Duran
 The Suite Life of Zack & Cody – Zack Martin (Dylan Sprouse)
 The Suite Life on Deck – Zack Martin (Dylan Sprouse)
 iCarly – Ms. Fielder (Cherise Bangs)

Animation
 Baby Looney Tunes – Baby Lola Bunny
 Curious George – Betsy
 The Grim Adventures of Billy & Mandy – Billy's Mom (Gladys), Mindy, Nergal Jr. and Eris
 The Buzz on Maggie – Maria Monarch

Commercials
 Disney Channel Games – Dylan Sprouse

References

External links
 
 

1978 births
Living people
Voice actresses from Toyama Prefecture
Japanese voice actresses
Mausu Promotion voice actors